The Glasgow and West of Scotland Football League was formed in 1898 as one of several supplementary football leagues that operated at the time to give extra fixtures to the various Scottish Football League sides.

The league folded in 1906 when the Scottish League's First Division expanded to 18 clubs.

Original members
The eight original members were Abercorn, Ayr Parkhouse (not a Scottish League side), Kilmarnock, Linthouse, Morton, Partick Thistle, Port Glasgow Athletic and St Mirren.

Membership
Abercorn 1898–1899
Airdrieonians 1902–1903
Ayr Parkhouse 1898–1899
Clyde 1899–1906
Hamilton Academical 1903–1906
Kilmarnock 1898–1906
Linthouse 1898–1899
Morton 1898–1906
Motherwell 1902–1906
Partick Thistle 1898–1902
Port Glasgow Athletic 1898–1906
St Mirren 1898–1902

Champions
1898–99 St Mirren
1899–1900 Morton / Kilmarnock (shared)
1900–01 Morton
1901–02 Port Glasgow Athletic
1902–03 Motherwell
1903–04 Port Glasgow Athletic
1904–05 Clyde
1905–06 Kilmarnock

Glasgow and West of Scotland Shield

In 1907 a tournament was staged to determine which club would keep the championship shield for good. Clyde defeated Hamilton Accies in the final, 3–2 on aggregate over two legs.

See also
Scottish Football (Defunct Leagues)

References

Defunct football leagues in Scotland
1898 establishments in Scotland
Sports leagues established in 1898
Sports leagues disestablished in 1907
1907 disestablishments in Scotland

he:ליגות כדורגל מוספות#ליגת הכדורגל של גלאזגו ומערב סקוטלנד